Caraphia seriata is a species of beetle in the family Cerambycidae. It was described by Chemsak and Linsley in 1984. It is found in Honduras and Guatemala.

References

Lepturinae
Beetles described in 1984